The Huahine rail (Gallirallus storrsolsoni) was a species of bird in the family Rallidae. It was a medium-sized Gallirallus rail endemic to Huahine in the Society Islands of French Polynesia.  It is known only from subfossil remains found at the Fa'ahia archaeological site on the island.  Fa'ahia is an early Polynesian occupation site with radiocarbon dates ranging from 700 CE to 1200 CE.  The rail is only one of a suite of birds found at the site which became extinct either locally or globally following human occupation of the island.

Etymology
The species was named after Storrs Olson to recognise his contributions to the systematics, paleontology and evolution of flightless rails on islands.

References

 Kirchman, Jeremy J.; & Steadman, David W. (2006). New Species of Rails (Aves: Rallidae) From an Archaeological Site on Huahine, Society Islands. Pacific Science 60: 281. 

Gallirallus
Extinct birds of Oceania
Birds of the Society Islands
Late Quaternary prehistoric birds
Holocene extinctions
Huahine
Birds described in 2006